Rear Admiral Anthony Jonathan Parr,  (born 4 August 1955) was the Chief of the Royal New Zealand Navy from April 2009 to November 2012. He was succeeded by Rear Admiral Jack Steer.

Early life
Parr was born in Wellington, New Zealand. He was raised in Fiji and attended New Plymouth Boys' High School as a boarder. He graduated from the University of Waikato in 1977 with a Bachelor of Social Science in politics and after completing the first year of a Bachelor of Law degree in 1979, he joined the Royal New Zealand Navy in January 1980 in the rank of sub lieutenant.

Naval career

Since leaving Te Mana, Parr served at HQ Joint Forces New Zealand, holding a number of senior positions in the RNZN.

In the 1986 New Zealand Royal Visit Honours, Parr was appointed a Member of the Royal Victorian Order. In the 2012 New Year Honours, he was appointed an Officer of the New Zealand Order of Merit for services to the State.

Dates of rank

References

External links
 Chief of Navy 

1955 births
Living people
New Zealand Members of the Royal Victorian Order
Officers of the New Zealand Order of Merit
People educated at New Plymouth Boys' High School
Royal New Zealand Navy admirals
University of Waikato alumni